Paul Fournel (born 20 May 1947 in Saint-Étienne) is a French writer, poet, publisher, and cultural ambassador. He was educated at the École normale supérieure of Saint-Cloud (1968–1972). Fournel wrote his master's thesis on Raymond Queneau and published the first book-length study of the Oulipo, Clefs pour la littérature potentielle ("Keys to potential literature"). He joined the Oulipo, first as "slave," then (in 1972) as full member, and he currently serves both as the Provisionally Definitive Secretary and the President of that group. He is also a regent of the College of 'Pataphysics.

Fournel has worked at various publishing houses, notably Hachette, Honoré Champion, Ramsay, and Seghers. From 1996 to 2000 he was director of the Alliance Française in San Francisco, and from 2000 to 2003 he was the French cultural attaché in Cairo. He has been France's cultural attaché in London.

Honors
1989: Prix Goncourt de la Nouvelle, Les Athlètes dans leur tête

Publications 

 Clefs pour la littérature potentielle, 1972
 L’Equilatère, 1972
 L’histoire véritable de Guignol, 1975
 Les petites filles respirent le même air que nous, 1978
 Les grosses rêveuses, 1981
 Les aventures très douces de Timothée le rêveur, 1982
 Un rocker de trop, 1982
 Superchat contre Vilmatou, 1985
 Les Athlètes dans leur tête, 1988
 Un homme regarde une femme, 2009
 Le jour que je suis grand, 1995
 Guignol, les Mourguet, 1995
 Pac de Cro détective, 1997
 Toi qui connais du monde, poems, 1997
 Alphabet Gourmand, 1998, with Harry Mathews and Boris Tissot
 Foraine, 1999,
 Besoin de vélo, essays, 2001; Need for the Bike, trans. Allan Stoekl
 Timothée dans l'arbre, 2003
 Poils de cairote, 2004
 Chamboula, 2007 
 Les animaux d'amour, 2007

External links 
Fournel's web site (French)
Fournel's page in the official Oulipo web site (French)
"Oulipo at 45" by Paul Fournel
"Our Mistake" by Paul Fournel
A short play by Paul Fournel at UpRightDown

Writers from Saint-Étienne
1947 births
Living people
ENS Fontenay-Saint-Cloud-Lyon alumni
20th-century French poets
French children's writers
Commandeurs of the Ordre des Arts et des Lettres
Oulipo members
Pataphysicians
Lycée Henri-IV alumni
French male poets
Prix Goncourt de la nouvelle recipients
French expatriates in the United States
French expatriates in Egypt
20th-century French male writers
French male non-fiction writers
Cycling writers
Cultural attachés
Prix Renaudot des lycéens winners